The American Naturalist is the monthly peer-reviewed scientific journal of the American Society of Naturalists, whose purpose is "to advance and to diffuse knowledge of organic evolution and other broad biological principles so as to enhance the conceptual unification of the biological sciences."  It was established in 1867 and is published by the University of Chicago Press. The journal covers research in ecology, evolutionary biology, population, and integrative biology. , the editor-in-chief is Daniel I. Bolnick. According to the Journal Citation Reports, the journal had a 2020 impact factor of 3.926.

History

The journal was founded by Alpheus Hyatt, Edward S. Morse, Alpheus S. Packard Jr., and Frederick W. Putnam at the Essex Institute in Salem, Massachusetts. The first issue appeared in print dated March 1867. In 1885 the four men founded the American Naturalist Society, where in 1887 the journal was designated an official organ of the society for publication.

In 1878 the journal was for sale and Edward Cope bought half the rights. He moved the journal to Philadelphia and arranged to edit it jointly with Professor Alpheus S. Packard Jr. Cope became editor-in-chief in 1887 and continued in that capacity until his death in 1897. 

In 1897, a group of professors from M.I.T., Harvard, and Tufts bought the rights from the Cope estate and kept the journal in publication until 1907 when J. McKeen Cattell acquired control. Cattell's son Jacques became co-editor and publisher with his father in 1939. 

Although the ASN became increasingly involved in editing The American Naturalist through changes in 1941 and 1951, the journal remained with the Cattell family until 1968, when the University of Chicago Press took it over after Jacques Cattell's death.

References

External links 
 
 

1867 establishments
Academic journals associated with learned and professional societies of the United States
Biology journals
Ecology journals
English-language journals
Monthly journals
Publications established in 1867
University of Chicago Press academic journals